William Andrus Alcott (August 6, 1798 – March 29, 1859), also known as William Alexander Alcott, was an American educator, educational reformer, physician, vegetarian and author of 108 books. His works, which include a wide range of topics including educational reform, physical education, school house design, family life, and diet, are still widely cited today.

Early life and family

William Alcott was born in Wolcott, Connecticut. His father was a farmer, Obedience Alcox (1776–1847); in the 1820s, like many members of the family, he altered the spelling of his last name, which on his tombstone appears as "Obid. Alcott". His mother was Anna Andrus (1777–1864) who was the daughter of a Revolutionary War soldier and William's most important educational influence. He attended local schools and became a close friend with his near neighbor Amos Bronson Alcott who would later enjoy wide fame as a philosopher and as the father of writer Louisa May Alcott. Although sometimes described simply as "cousins" the two were actually second cousins; William's grandfather David Alcott (1740–1841) was the brother of Amos Bronson Alcott's grandfather, Captain John Alcott. The two boys shared books, exchanged ideas, and started a small library together. Odell Shepard had written of Amos Bronson Alcott, "Indeed there is a sense in which nearly everything Alcott wrote and did is attributable to William".

Alcott lived in Dedham, Massachusetts where he was the superintendent of the Sunday School at the Allin Congregational Church. He was known to walk barefoot in summer mornings from his home in the village up to Federal Hill to obtain a bucket of milk.

Teaching and medical education

At the age of 18 Alcott began teaching in a school located just a few yards from his father's house. With brief interruptions, he would continue to teach for the next nine years. His experiences as a student country school teacher would later become the subject of many of his later publications. He observed that the benches used by students were often painful and, at his own expense built backs onto the benches; these became the ancestors of the later school desks. He campaigned for better heating and ventilation in schools. He labored to improve the intellectual content of classrooms. While he was successful as a teacher, in the summer of 1824 he suffered an attack of the disfiguring, dangerous skin infection erysipelas, and about this time was beginning to suffer from tuberculosis. He would suffer symptoms of both for the remainder of his life. He began studying medicine, with the thought that the extra knowledge would aid his teaching. His formal study of medicine was brief. In the winter of 1825–26 he attended "a regular course of medical studies" in New Haven, Connecticut. In March 1826 he was granted a license to practice medicine. In addition to teaching, he practiced medicine at least until 1829.

William Channing Woodbridge and early writing

In the spring of 1830 he met William Channing Woodbridge. Woodbridge had just returned from Europe and was in the process of revising his second geography. Alcott at first worked as an assistant to Woodbridge for which he was paid twelve dollars a month to check facts and improve maps. The two became close friends. In 1831, Woodbridge purchased the American Journal of Education and renamed it American Annals of Education And Instruction. The two men then moved to Boston. Alcott wrote many articles for the journal, especially those dealing with school design and physical education. Even after Woodbridge lost control of the Journal in 1836 and became its foreign editor, Alcott became its Editor in 1837. He would later publish a poignant memoir of Woodbridge's life. While still teaching he had begun to contribute articles to newspapers and started work on the book that would become The Young Man's Guide.

Later life

On June 14, 1836, he married Phebe Lewis Bronson (June 14, 1812 – November 9, 1907). They had three children. For a time they shared a house, Cottage Place, with the family of his old friend and cousin Amos Bronson Alcott. In the 1840s William moved to the town of Newton, Massachusetts, just outside Boston. Eventually he would settle into a house in Auburndale in the town of Newton. He died here of a lung infection. He worked until the day before he died. William Alcott is buried in Newton Cemetery.

"Vegetable Diet" 

Alcott published "Vegetable Diet: As Sanctioned by Medical Men and By Experience in All Ages." in 1838. It is his best known work and is significant to the medical literature about a vegetarian diet. A second edition was published in 1849 "with an added cookbook and medical testimonies supporting what today would be called a vegan diet."

In 2009, author Andrew Smith said in the book "Eating History" that "Vegetable Diet" was "America's first vegetarian cookbook." In 2020, journalist Avery Yale Kamila wrote: "The book is considered a seminal work in the cannon of American vegetarian literature." The book contains letters written by physicians, including Horace A. Barrows, about vegetarian diets. The book is still in print.

The book is included in the American Antiquarian Cookbook Collection. In 2012, the book was republished by Andrews McMeel publishing with an introduction by Anna Thomas.

Ideas, diet and morals

Alcott became one of the most prolific authors in early American history. He wrote frequently on the topics of education and health. In 1836 he wrote a letter to the editor of the Boston Medical and Surgical Journal titled "The Graham System" (May 4, p. 199-201; he signed it "M.D." The cause of greatest interest to Alcott throughout his life was vegetarianism. In 1850 he wrote three long letters on vegetarianism to the editor of the New York Tribune - at the request of the editor (Aug 14, Nov. 6). Here he shows clearly that his preference was for a diet that used no animal products - what would today be called a vegan diet.

Alcott opposed the consumption of alcohol, coffee, meat, spices and tea. He argued against the use of condiments which were "stimulating" substances. He rejected the use of ginger, fennel, cardamom, mace, nutmeg and coriander. He believed that garlic, horseradish, molasses and sauces were disgusting and indecent "drugs".

Alcott wrote The Physiology of Marriage in 1856. He deplored free courtship manners. He specifically deplored "conversation which is too excitable", "presence of exciting books", "unnecessary heat", and many other courtship practices prevalent in 18th century America but steadily going out of fashion by 1856. He warned young people of the dangers of courtship. He is criticized by modern-day feminists for his "rigidity".

Alcott edited the Moral Reformer (1835-1939) in Boston, a journal dedicated to eliminating intemperance, gluttony and licentiousness. He was the editor of the vegetarian Library of Health journal. In 1840, the Moral Reformer and The Graham Journal of Health and Longevity were merged in the Library of Health.

Alcott was a founding member of the American Physiological Society in 1837, America's first vegetarian organization. He was a founding member (in 1850) and the first president of the American Vegetarian Society.

Works
In all, he wrote about one hundred works, which have been influential in reforming educational methods, and improving the physical and moral well-being of mankind.

Books
Confessions of a School Master, 1839
The Young Man’s Guide, 1834
The Young Woman's Guide
The Use of Tobacco: Its Physical, Intellectual, and Moral Effects on The Human System 1836
Vegetable Diet: As Sanctioned by Medical Men, and by Experience in All Ages, 1838
Tea And Coffee, 1839
The Boy’s Guide to Usefulness, 1845
Art of Good Behavior, 1848
The Young Housekeeper, 1842
The Young Mother Or Management Of Children In Regard To Health
The Young Mother
Adventures of Lot, the Nephew of Abraham
Familiar letters to young men on various subjects.: Designed as a companion to The young man's guide.
Trust in the Lord; or the Story of Elijah and the Ravens.
Stories of Eliot and the Indians
Lectures on Life and Health, Or, The Laws and Means of Physical Culture, 1853
The House I Live In The first Anatomy book for the general public.
Forty Years in the Wilderness of Pills and Powders, 1859
The Laws of Health: Or, Sequel to "The house I live in", 1859

See also
List of vegetarians

References

Notes

Citations

Sources
 Alcott, William A. "Memoir of William C. Woodbridge" American Journal of Education 5 (1858) 51-64
 Hyowitz, Carol; Weissman, Michaele: A History of Women In America

External links

 
 
 
 William A. Alcott at the Animal Rights Library

1798 births
1859 deaths
19th-century American educators
19th-century American physicians
American children's writers
American non-fiction writers
American vegetarianism activists
People associated with physical culture
Tea critics
American magazine editors
Writers from Dedham, Massachusetts